Majhari is a village in Mohania block of Kaimur district, Bihar, India. As of 2011, its population was 3,448, in 505 households.

References 

Villages in Kaimur district